Sakari Mattila (born 14 July 1989) is a Finnish professional football defender who plays for HIFK. Mattila was born in Tampere, but began his senior club career in Helsinki playing for Klubi-04, before making his league debut for HJK at age 18 in 2008.

Mattila was the captain of the Finnish under-19 national team and made his international senior level debut for Finland in March 2014, at the age of 24 and has since appeared in 2016 UEFA European Championship qualifications and 2018 FIFA World Cup qualifications.

Club career

HJK Helsinki
Before the season 2008, HJK was on a training camp in Marbella and Mattila was spotted by scouts of Sevilla FC and Málaga CF. He was playing on schoolboy terms, but HJK managed to sign a three-year contract with him.

In August 2008, Serie A club Palermo called him up for a week-long trial after scouting him in Helsinki. Just a week after his visit to Palermo, Udinese Calcio called him up for a week-long trial. Before leaving to Udine, Mattila stated that he is ready for a move to Italy. In October, Iltasanomat told that Udinese had made an offer, but HJK rejected the first bid. The asking price was said to be around 700.000 euros. After rumours about his move to Udinese, Mattila stated that he wants to make a career in Italy and was hoping for a move in the next transfer window.

Udinese Calcio
In November 2008, he signed a 4.5-year contract with Udinese and joined the club in January 2009. He played with the Primavera team and in July 2009 left on loan for Ascoli.

On 10 August 2010 he was loaned again. This time to AC Bellinzona, playing in the Swiss top level.

On 29 July 2012, it was announced that Mattila had joined his former club, HJK, on loan until end of December 2013.

Aalesunds FK

On 3 November 2013, it was announced that Mattila has signed a three-year contract with Aalesunds FK in Norway's Tippeligaen.

Fulham FC

On 4 August 2015 Mattila signed for Fulham FC for an undisclosed fee.
On 8 August 2016 his contract was terminated by mutual consent.

Sønderjyske Elitesport 
Two days after he terminated his contract with Fulham FC, Matilla signed for SønderjyskE. He signed a three-year contract. Mattila made his Superliga debut on 14 August 2016 in a match against Brøndby when on 64th minute he replaced Adama Guira as a substitute.

Fredrikstad

On 29 July 2018, Mattila signed a contract with Fredrikstad.

International career

He made his debut for the Finnish national team on 30 October 2013 in a friendly match in Qualcomm Stadium, San Diego against Mexico. Mattila earned his second cap for Finland on 5 March 2014, in the 2:1 away win over Hungary in a friendly match after coming on as a last minute substitute for Roman Eremenko. Mattila made his UEFA European Championship qualification match debut on 29 March 2015 on Windsor Park when Mixu Paatelainen chose him to the starting eleven for a match against Northern Ireland.

Career statistics

Club

International

Honours and achievements

Club
HJK Helsinki
Veikkausliiga: 2012, 2013
Finnish Cup: 2008

References

External links

 SønderjyskE Fodbold official profile 
 
 
 
 
 

1989 births
Living people
Finnish footballers
Finland youth international footballers
Finland under-21 international footballers
Finland international footballers
Finnish expatriate footballers
Helsingin Jalkapalloklubi players
Udinese Calcio players
Ascoli Calcio 1898 F.C. players
AC Bellinzona players
Fulham F.C. players
SønderjyskE Fodbold players
Fredrikstad FK players
Klubi 04 players
HIFK Fotboll players
Aalesunds FK players
Veikkausliiga players
Norwegian Second Division players
Serie B players
Danish Superliga players
Swiss Super League players
Swiss Challenge League players
Eliteserien players
English Football League players
Association football midfielders
Footballers from Tampere
Expatriate footballers in Norway
Expatriate footballers in Italy
Expatriate footballers in Switzerland
Expatriate footballers in England
Expatriate men's footballers in Denmark
Finnish expatriate sportspeople in Norway
Finnish expatriate sportspeople in Italy
Finnish expatriate sportspeople in Switzerland
Finnish expatriate sportspeople in England
Finnish expatriate sportspeople in Denmark